Albert Edward may refer to:

People
 Edward VII of the United Kingdom
 Albert Edward (soccer) (born 1991), Australian footballer
 Albert Edward Litherland (born 1928), British nuclear physicist and accelerator mass spectrometry pioneer

Places
 Albert Edward Bay, Nunavut, Canada
 Mount Albert Edward (British Columbia), Canada
 Mount Albert Edward, Papua New Guinea

Other uses
 Albert Edward Bridge, railway bridge spanning the River Severn at Coalbrookdale in Shropshire, England
 Albert Edward, one of the GWR 3031 Class locomotives that were built for and run on the Great Western Railway between 1891 and 1915